"City on Our Knees" is a song by Christian artist TobyMac from his album, Tonight (2010). It was released as a radio single in August 2009 and reached No. 1 on Billboards Hot Christian Songs chart in October 2009. It also reached No. 8 on Billboard's Heatseekers Songs. The song was nominated for a Grammy Award as the Best Gospel Song. The song also charted at No. 4 on the Bubbling Under Hot 100 Singles chart. The song sold over 17,000 digital units in its first week. As of February 20, 2010, the song has sold over 225,000 copies, making it the fastest charting and selling track of tobyMac's career. It won a Dove Award for Pop/Contemporary Song of the year.

Background
On McKeehan's YouTube account, he posted a video talking about the meaning of the song; "'City on our Knees' is really about a moment. A moment that we all come together. Where our differences fall by the wayside. And it's really a reminder that that moment could be right now, tonight."

Track listing

Awards
In 2010, the song was nominated for a Dove Award for Pop/Contemporary Recorded Song of the Year at the 41st GMA Dove Awards.

Charts

Certifications

References

2009 songs
TobyMac songs
Songs written by Cary Barlowe
Songs written by TobyMac